European route E7 forms part of the international E-road network. It runs from Langon in France to Zaragoza in Spain (the UNECE designate the northern terminus of the E7 as Pau, but current road signage, and other entities such as Google Maps, place the northern terminus of E7 at the A62/A65 interchange near Langon).

Route

France
: Langon - Mont-de-Marsan - Pau
: Pau (multiplex with )
:  - Lescar
: Lescar - Jurançon
: Jurançon - Oloron-Sainte-Marie - France-Spain border (Urdos)

Spain
: France-Spain border (Canfranc) - Jaca
: Jaca - Sabiñánigo
: Sabiñánigo
: Sabiñánigo - Huesca - Zaragoza (end at )

References

External links 
 UN Economic Commission for Europe: Overall Map of E-road Network (2007)

07
Roads in France
Roads in Spain